Robert Gray, Robbie Gray, Bob Gray or Bobby Gray may refer to:

Sportspeople
Robert Gray (discus thrower) (born 1956), Canadian Olympic athlete
Robbie Gray (born 1988), Australian rules footballer
Bob Gray (Australian footballer) (1943–2008), Australian rules footballer for Footscray
Bob Gray (cross-country skier) (born 1939), American Olympic skier
Bobby Gray (American football) (born 1978), former safety in the National Football League
Bobby Gray (boxer), boxer from San Jose, California

Association football
Robert Gray (footballer, born 1927) (1927–2018), Scottish footballer
Robert Gray (footballer, born 1951), Scottish footballer
Robert Gray (footballer, born 1953), Scottish footballer
Robert Gray (footballer, born 1970), English footballer
Bob Gray (footballer, born 1872) (1872–1926), Scottish football player (Grimsby Town)
Bob Gray (footballer, born 1923) (1923–2022), English football goalkeeper
Bob Gray (soccer) (born 1952), former head men's soccer coach at Marshall University

Politicians
Robert Isaac Dey Gray (c. 1772–1804), Canadian politician
Robert Gray (Mississippi politician) (born 1969), politician from the US state of Mississippi
Robert Gray (North Carolina politician), state legislator
Robert Gray (Scottish politician) (c. 1895–1975), Scottish nationalist activist
Bob Gray (Australian politician) (1898–1978), Australian politician in Victoria
Bob Gray (South Dakota politician) (born 1971), American politician in the South Dakota Senate
Bob Gray, educator and candidate in the United States House of Representatives elections in Michigan, 2010

Other

Robert Gray (accountancy academic) (born 1948), British social and environmental accounting theorist
Robert Gray (actor) (1945–2013), actor in Armed and Dangerous
Robert Gray (bishop of Bristol) (1762–1834), father of the Bishop of Cape Town
Robert Gray (bishop of Cape Town) (1809–1872), first Anglican Bishop of Cape Town
Robert Gray (ornithologist) (1825–1887), Scottish ornithologist
Robert Gray (poet) (born 1945), Australian poet
Robert Gray (sea captain) (1755–1806), American merchant sea-captain and explorer
Robert Gray (writer), executive producer of The Paul O'Grady Show and Like It Is
Robert A. Gray (1834–1906), Union Army soldier and Medal of Honor recipient
Robert H. Gray (1948–2021), American data analyst, author, and astronomer
Robert Hampton Gray (1917–1945), Canadian naval officer, pilot, and recipient of the Victoria Cross
Robert Keith Gray (1921–2014), Republican activist and public relations executive
Robert M. Gray (born 1943), American information theorist
R. W. Gray, Canadian writer and film studies academic
Robert Whytlaw-Gray (1877–1958), English chemist
Bob Gray (priest) (born 1970), Irish Anglican priest
Rob Gray (art director) (1962–2016), Canadian production designer
Bob Gray, a name espoused by "Pennywise the Dancing Clown" from Stephen King's It

See also
R. Henry Grey (1891–1934), American silent film actor who was sometimes credited as Robert Gray
Robert Grey (disambiguation)
Rob Gray (disambiguation)